Andrew Silver is an American film director, writer and producer.

Biography
He earned 2 degrees at MIT, and his doctorate in organizational psychology from Harvard Business School.

Silver is a co-author of "A Film Director's Approach to Managing Creativity," 
a chapter in Breakthrough Thinking, published by the Harvard Business School Press.

He is a research affiliate at MIT, where he leads a seminar.

His film career began with Kurt Vonnegut's "Next Door" which won a prize 
and played on Masterpiece Theater. His current film series is called
"May It Happen For You" and has the award winning Radio Cape Cod,
Second Wind, and Surprise Engagement, and documentaries about leadership and
early childhood education. 

His course at MIT IAP explores leadership, team building, managing creativity.

Filmography
Selected Films
 Exploring Leadership (2023)
 Second Wind/Radio Cape Cod (2020) - Producer, director
 Profiles in Aspiration (2018)
 Surprise Engagement (2015) - Producer, director
 Radio Cape Cod (2008) - Producer, director
 Return (1985) - from Some Other Place. The Right Place by Donald Harington. Producer, Director
 Prophetic Voices (1984) - Producer - Director
 Harry Callahan, A Need to See and Express (1982)
 The Murderer (1976) - Producer - Director - adapted from the story by Ray Bradbury
 Next Door (1975)    - Producer - Director - adapted from the story by Kurt Vonnegut

References

External links
 

1942 births
Living people
American documentary film directors
Massachusetts Institute of Technology alumni
Brandeis University faculty
Harvard Business School alumni
English-language film directors